The Macy's Thanksgiving Day Parade is an annual parade in New York City presented by the U.S.-based department store chain Macy's. The Parade first took place in 1924, tying it for the second-oldest Thanksgiving parade in the United States with America's Thanksgiving Parade in Detroit (with both parades being four years younger than Philadelphia's Thanksgiving Day Parade). The three-hour parade is held in Manhattan, ending outside Macy's Herald Square, takes place from 9:00 a.m. to 12:00 p.m. Eastern Standard Time on Thanksgiving Day, and has been televised nationally on NBC since 1953. The Parade's workforce is made up of Macy's employees and their friends and family, all of whom work as volunteers.

History

Early history
In 1924, store employees marched to Macy's Herald Square, the flagship store on 34th Street, dressed in vibrant costumes. There were floats, professional bands and live animals borrowed from the Central Park Zoo. At the end of that first parade, Santa Claus was welcomed into Herald Square. At this first parade, Santa was enthroned on the Macy's balcony at the 34th Street store entrance, where he was then crowned "King of the Kiddies". With an audience of over 250,000 people, the parade was such a success that Macy's declared it would become an annual event, despite media reports only barely covering the first parade.

The Macy's parade was enough of a success to push Ragamuffin Day, the typical children's Thanksgiving Day activity from 1870 into the 1920s, into obscurity. Ragamuffin Day featured children going around and performing a primitive version of trick-or-treating, a practice that by the 1920s had come to annoy most adults. The public backlash against such begging in the 1930s (when most Americans were struggling in the midst of the Great Depression) led to promotion of alternatives, including Macy's parade. While ragamuffin parades that competed with Macy's would continue into the 1930s, the competition from Macy's would overwhelm the practice, and the last ragamuffin parade in New York City would take place in 1956.

Anthony "Tony" Frederick Sarg loved to work with marionettes from an early age. After moving to London to start his own marionette business, Sarg moved to New York City to perform with his puppets on the street. Macy's heard about Sarg's talents and asked him to design a window display of a parade for the store.

Growth and changes
Through the 1930s, the parade continued to grow, with crowds of over one million people lining the parade route in 1933. The first Mickey Mouse balloon entered the parade in 1934. The annual festivities were broadcast on local radio stations in New York City from 1932 to 1941 and resumed in 1945, running through 1951.

The parade was suspended from 1942 to 1944 as a result of World War II because rubber and helium were needed for the war effort. The parade resumed in 1945 and became known nationwide shortly afterwards, having been prominently featured in the 1947 film Miracle on 34th Street, which included footage of the 1946 festivities. The event had its first broadcast on network television in 1948 (see ). From 1984 to 2019, the balloons were made by Raven Industries of Sioux Falls, South Dakota, through its Raven Aerostar division.

Since 1985, the parade was traditionally led by the New York City Police Department Highway Patrol. In 2019, the cast of Sesame Street led the parade in honor of the show's 50th anniversary.

Following an incident in 2005 where a balloon knocked over a street light and injured spectators (see ), new safety measures were incorporated in 2006 to prevent accidents and balloon-related injuries. One measure taken was the installation of wind measurement devices to alert parade organizers to any unsafe conditions that could cause the balloons to behave erratically. In addition, parade officials implemented a measure to keep the balloons closer to the ground during windy conditions. New York City law prohibits Macy's from flying the full-size balloons if sustained winds exceed  or wind gusts exceed ; New York's tall buildings and mostly uniform grid plan can amplify wind velocity on city streets. This law, imposed in 1997, has never been activated, despite several close calls; the only time the parade balloons were ever grounded was in 1971. Each balloon has a risk profile to determine handling in windy conditions; taller, upright balloons are rotated to appear horizontal and face downward in such situations (as was the case in 2019, when a grounding was narrowly averted). The remaining floats and performances will continue as scheduled should the balloons be grounded.

The 2018 parade was the coldest to date, with the temperature at 19 °F (-7.2 °C) during the event. The warmest was in 1933 at 69 °F (20.5 °C). The 2006 parade was the wettest with 1.72" (49 mm) of rain. Actresses Caitlin Kinnunen and Isabelle McCalla's kiss during The Proms performance at the 2018 parade received significant media attention for being the first broadcast of a same-sex kiss in the parade's history.

Due to the COVID-19 pandemic in New York City, the 2020 parade was downsized and closed to the public—being filmed as a broadcast-only event in the Herald Square area. There were 88% fewer participants, and social distancing was enforced. The event did not include college and high school marching bands (with the affected bands having been reinvited for 2021), nor any participant under 18 years of age. Balloons were tethered to a "specially rigged anchor vehicle framework of five specialty vehicles" rather than carried by handlers. Mayor of New York City Bill de Blasio stated that it will "[not be] a live parade, but something that will really give us that warmth and that great feeling we have on Thanksgiving day." In 2021, the Macy's Thanksgiving Day Parade returned to its traditional in-person procession with 6,500 participants marching in the Parade.

Balloons 

The balloons were introduced in 1928, replacing live zoo animals. Sarg's large animal-shaped balloons were produced by the Goodyear Tire and Rubber Company in Akron, Ohio from the 1920s through 1980. That year there was no procedure to deflate the balloons, and they were simply released. In 1928 five of the giant balloons were designed and filled with helium to rise above  and slowly deflate for whoever was lucky enough to capture the contestants in Macy's "balloon race[s]" and return them for a reward of $100 (equivalent to more than $1,600 with inflation as of 2021), this lasted until 1932.

The balloons in the Macy's Thanksgiving Day Parade have had several varieties. The oldest is the novelty balloon class, consisting of smaller balloons ranging widely in size and handled by between one and thirty people (the smallest balloons are shaped like human heads and fit on the heads of the handlers). The larger and more popular class is the character balloons, primarily consisting of licensed pop-culture characters; each of these (16 in 2019) is handled by exactly 90 people. From 2005 to 2012, a third balloon class, the "Blue Sky Gallery", transformed the works of contemporary artists into full-size balloons; after a five-year hiatus, the Blue Sky Gallery returned in 2018.

Balloons listed by year introduced

Character balloons
{| class="wikitable"
|- 
! Year
! Balloons
|-
|-
| style="text-align:center;" |1928
| Fish, Tiger, Hummingbird, Sky Elephant, Early Bird
|-
| style="text-align:center;" |1929
| The Katzenjammers, The Turk, Turkey, Dragon (longest balloon to ever appear in the Parade)
|-
| style="text-align:center;" |1930
|Joe Jinks, Barney Google, Boob McNutt, Benny
|-
| style="text-align:center;" |1931
| Tiamat the Dragon, Jerry the Pig, Two-Headed Giant, Cheetah, Blue Hippo
|-
| style="text-align:center;" |1932
| Felix the Cat, Willie Red Bird, Fritz the Dachshund
|-
|1933
|Gulliver, The Colicky Kid
|-
| style="text-align:center;" |1934
|Mickey Mouse, Eddie Cantor (the only full-size balloon to be based on a living person), Little Pig, The Big Bad Wolf, 
|-
| style="text-align:center;" |1935
|Donald Duck, Turkey, Harpo Marx, The Indian
|-
|1936
|Father Knickerbocker, Dragon, Two-Headed Pirate
|-
| style="text-align:center;" |1937
| Morton the Nantucket Sea Monster (redesigned version of Dragon Balloon, and second-longest balloon to appear in the Parade), Officer SOS 13 (redesigned version of Father Knickerbocker Balloon), Pinocchio, Christmas Stocking, The Man on the Trapeze
|-
| style="text-align:center;" |1938
|Uncle Sam, Ferdinand the Bull, Little Man Big Man
|-
| style="text-align:center;" |1939
|The Tin Man, Santa Claus
|-
| style="text-align:center;" |1940
| Hippopotamus, Superman, Laffo the Clown
|-
| style="text-align:center;" |1941
|Hugo the Football Player (redesigned version of Superman Balloon), Goldfish, Elephant
|-
| style="text-align:center;" |1945
| Bobo the Hobo (Clown), The Young Man on the Flying Trapeze, Teddy Bear, Pumpkin, Ice Cream Cone
|-
| style="text-align:center;" |1946
| The Baseball Player (redesigned version of Bobo the Hobo), Panda Bear (redesigned version of Teddy Bear Balloon), Pilgrim Father, Candy Cane
|-
| style="text-align:center;" |1947
| Pirate, Officer PAL (redesigned version of Baseball Player Balloon), The Gnome (Redesigned version of Ice Cream Cone Balloon)
|-
| style="text-align:center;" |1948
| Fireman (redesigned version of Officer PAL Balloon), The Monkey on the High Trapeze, Crocodile
|-
| style="text-align:center;" |1949
|Hobo Clown (redesigned version of Fireman Balloon), Dachshund, Howdy Doody
|-
| style="text-align:center;" |1950
| Toy Soldier, Rainbow Trout
|-
| style="text-align:center;" |1951
|Mighty Mouse
|-
|1952
|Spaceman
|-
|1953
|Dachshund (second version), Goldfish with Pinkish Fins (redesigned version of the Rainbow Trout Balloon)
|-
|1954
|Gorgeous Gobbler
|-
|1956
|Observer
|-
| style="text-align:center;" |1957
|Popeye
|-
| style="text-align:center;" |1960
|Happy Dragon
|-
| style="text-align:center;" |1961
|Bullwinkle J. Moose
|-
| style="text-align:center;" |1962
|The Flying Trapeze (redesigned version of the Observer Balloon), Donald Duck (second version)
|-
| style="text-align:center;" |1963
|Dino, Elsie the Cow
|-
| style="text-align:center;" |1964
|Linus the Lionhearted
|-
| style="text-align:center;" |1965
|Underdog
|-
| style="text-align:center;" |1966
|Superman (second version), Smokey Bear
|-
| style="text-align:center;" |1968
|Aviator Snoopy
|-
| style="text-align:center;" |1969
|Astronaut Snoopy (second version, a tribute to Apollo 11)
|-
|1971
|Smile (redesigned version of the Elsie the Cow balloon), Mickey Mouse (second version)
|-
| style="text-align:center;" |1975
|Weeble
|-
| style="text-align:center;" |1977
|Kermit the Frog
|-
| style="text-align:center;" |1980
|Superman (third version, third-largest balloon to ever appear in the Parade)
|-
| style="text-align:center;" |1982
|Olive Oyl, Woody Woodpecker
|-
| style="text-align:center;" |1983
|Yogi Bear
|-
| style="text-align:center;" |1984
|Garfield, Raggedy Ann
|-
| style="text-align:center;" |1985
|Betty Boop
|-
| style="text-align:center;" |1986
|Humpty Dumpty (redesigned version of Weeble Balloon, and the 100th Balloon in the Parade's history), Swee'Pea (addition to Olive Oyl balloon), Baby Shamu
|-
| style="text-align:center;" |1987
|Spider-Man, Ronald McDonald, Snoopy on Skates (third version), Snuggle Bear,
|-
| style="text-align:center;" |1988
|Big Bird, Quik Bunny, Pink Panther, Snoopy (fourth version) and Woodstock
|-
| style="text-align:center;" |1989
|Bugs Bunny
|-
| style="text-align:center;" |1990
|Clifford the Big Red Dog, Bart Simpson
|-
| style="text-align:center;" |1991
|Babar the Elephant (redesigned version of the Smile balloon)
|-
| style="text-align:center;" |1992
|Santa Goofy
|-
| style="text-align:center;" |1993
|Beethoven (dog), Sonic the Hedgehog (first video game character in Parade history), Rex, Izzy
|-
| style="text-align:center;" |1994
|Barney, The Cat in the Hat
|-
| style="text-align:center;" |1995
|Dudley the Dragon, Sky Dancer, Eben Bear (redesigned version of Snuggle Bear Balloon)
|-
| style="text-align:center;" |1996
|Rocky and Bullwinkle (second version of Bullwinkle, first animated helium balloon in the parade's history), Peter Rabbit
|-
| style="text-align:center;" |1997
|Arthur, Rugrats, Bumpé, Petula Pig
|-
| style="text-align:center;" |1998
|Babe, Wild Thing, Dexter
|-
| style="text-align:center;" |1999
|Millennium Snoopy (fifth version), Honey Nut Cheerios Bee, Blue
|-
| style="text-align:center;" |2000
|Bandleader Mickey Mouse (third version), Jeeves, Ronald McDonald (second version), Dragon Tales' Cassie
|-
| style="text-align:center;" |2001
|Curious George, Pikachu, Big Bird (2nd version), Jimmy Neutron, Cheesasaurus Rex (first balloon with light-up feature)
|-
| style="text-align:center;" |2002
|Charlie Brown and the Elusive Football, Little Bill, Mr. Monopoly, Kermit the Frog (second version)
|-
| style="text-align:center;" |2003
|"Strike Up the Band" Barney (Second version), Super Grover, Garfield (second version)
|-
| style="text-align:center;" |2004
|Chicken Little, M&M's Red and Yellow Brighten the Holidays, SpongeBob SquarePants
|-
| style="text-align:center;" |2005
|Scooby-Doo, Dora the Explorer, Mr. Potato Head, JoJo's Circus
|-
| style="text-align:center;" |2006
|Snoopy as the Flying Ace (sixth version), Pikachu with Poké Ball (second version)
|-
| style="text-align:center;" |2007
|Abby Cadabby, Super Cute Hello Kitty, Shrek
|-
| style="text-align:center;" |2008
|Smurf, Buzz Lightyear, Horton the Elephant
|-
| style="text-align:center;" |2009
|Spider-Man (second version), Ronald McDonald (third version), Sailor Mickey (fourth version), Pillsbury Doughboy
|-
| style="text-align:center;" |2010
|Diary of a Wimpy Kid, Po from Kung Fu Panda
|-
| style="text-align:center;" |2011
|Sonic the Hedgehog (second version) Julius
|-
| style="text-align:center;" |2012
|Hello Kitty (second version), Papa Smurf, The Elf on the Shelf
|-
| style="text-align:center;" |2013
|Snoopy and Woodstock (seventh version for Snoopy, second version for Woodstock), SpongeBob SquarePants (second version), How to Train Your Dragon's Toothless, The Wizard of Oz 75th Anniversary Hot Air Balloon, Adventure Time with Finn & Jake
|-
| style="text-align:center;" |2014
|Thomas the Tank Engine; Paddington (second version, first time as a balloon); Red Mighty Morphin Power Ranger, Skylanders' Eruptor, Pikachu (third version); Pillsbury Doughboy (second version, identical to first version)
|-
| style="text-align:center;" |2015
|Ice Age's Scrat and his Acorn, Ronald McDonald (fourth version); [[The Angry Birds Movie|''Angry Birds Red]]; Dino (second version)
|-
| style="text-align:center;" |2016
|Charlie Brown (second version), Diary of a Wimpy Kid (second version), Trolls
|-
| style="text-align:center;" |2017
|Olaf, Jett from Super Wings, Chase from PAW Patrol, Dr. Seuss' The Grinch (Second version, first time as a Balloon; from the 2018 animated film)
|-
| style="text-align:center;" |2018
|Goku from Dragon Ball|-
| style="text-align:center;" |2019
|Astronaut Snoopy (eighth version), Green Eggs and Ham, SpongeBob SquarePants (Third version) with Gary
|-
| style="text-align:center;" |2020
|Red Titan from Ryan's World, The Boss Baby
|-
| style="text-align:center;" |2021
|Ada Twist, Scientist, Funko Pop!-Inspired Grogu, Ronald McDonald (fifth version), Pikachu and Eevee (fourth version for Pikachu)
|-
| style="text-align:center;" |2022
|Bluey, Diary of a Wimpy Kid (third version), Stuart the Minion, Sinclair's Dino and Baby Dino (third version for Dino)
|}

Novelty balloons

Blue Sky Gallery

Falloon
A falloon, a portmanteau of "float" and "balloon", is a float-based balloon. They were introduced in 1986.

Balloonicle
A balloonicle, a portmanteau of "balloon" and "vehicle", is a self-powered balloon vehicle. They were introduced in 2004.

Floalloonicle
A "floalloonicle", a portmanteau of "float", "balloon" and "vehicle", is a self-powered balloon vehicle structured around a float. They were introduced in 2021.

Heritage Balloon

"Heritage Balloons" are mid-sized helium balloons that have a sponsor other than Macy's. They were introduced in 2016.

Performers and acts

In addition to the well-known balloons and floats, the parade also features live music and other performances. College and high school marching bands from across the country participate in the parade. The television broadcasts feature performances by established and up-and-coming singers and bands. The Rockettes of Radio City Music Hall are a classic performance (having performed annually since 1957 as the last pre-parade act to perform, followed by a commercial break), as are cheerleaders and dancers chosen by the National Cheerleaders Association from various high schools across the country. The parade always concludes with the arrival of Santa Claus to ring in the Christmas and holiday season (except for the 1932 parade, when Santa led the parade). Since 2017, the Macy's Singing Christmas Tree choir precedes Santa Claus as the final performer of the parade.

On the NBC telecast from in front of the flagship Macy's store on Broadway and 34th Street, the marching bands perform live music. Most "live" performances by musicals and individual artists lip-sync to the studio, soundtrack or cast recordings of their songs, due to the technical difficulties of attempting to sing into a wireless microphone while in a moving vehicle (performers themselves typically perform on the floats); the NBC-flagged microphones used by performers on floats are almost always non-functioning props. Although rare, recent parade broadcasts have featured at least one live performance with no use of recorded vocals.

Featured performers

Broadway shows
Every year, cast members from some Broadway shows (usually shows that debuted that year) perform either in the parade or immediately preceding the parade in front of Macy's and before The Rockettes' performance (since NBC broadcasts the parade's start, the performances are shown during the wait for the parade itself). The 2007 parade was notable as it took place during a strike by the I.A.T.S.E. (a stagehands' union). Legally Blonde, the one performing musical affected by the strike, performed in show logo shirts, with makeshift props and no sets. The other three shows that year performed in theaters that were not affected by the strike.

Marching bands

Special guests
For the 10th anniversary of the September 11th attacks in 2011, the Macy's Thanksgiving Parade invited family members from Tuesday's Children (a nonprofit organization that benefits families directly impacted by terrorism) to cut the ribbon at the start of the parade with NBC's Al Roker and led the parade with Amy Kule, the Parade's executive producer.

Television coverage

More than 44 million people typically watch the parade on television on an annual basis. It was first televised locally in New York City in 1939 as an experimental broadcast on NBC's W2XBS (now WNBC). No television stations broadcast the parade in 1940 or 1941, but local broadcasts resumed when the parade returned in 1945 after the wartime suspension."Radio Today" (with television listings), The New York Times, November 22, 1945, p. 36. The parade began its network television appearances on CBS in 1948, the year that major, regular television network programming began."Radio and Television", The New York Times, November 21, 1949, p. 44. NBC has been the official broadcaster of the event since 1953. However, CBS (which has a studio in Times Square) also carries unauthorized coverage as The Thanksgiving Day Parade on CBS. The parade committee can endorse an official broadcaster as the parade takes place in public (however, they cannot award exclusive rights as other events, such as sporting events, which take place inside restricted-access stadiums, have the authority to do so). The rerouting of the parade starting from 2012 (see below) moved the parade out of the view of CBS's cameras and thus made it significantly more difficult for the network to cover the parade. However, the route now passes along the west side of the network's Black Rock headquarters building along Sixth Avenue (with the hosts stationed on a temporary tower platform at the Sixth/W. 53rd St. corner of the building), and CBS nevertheless continues to cover the parade as before.

Since 2003, the parade has been broadcast in Spanish on the sister network of NBCUniversal (Telemundo) hosted by María Celeste Arrarás from 2003 to 2006. The parade won nine Emmy Awards for outstanding achievements in special event coverage since 1979. Since 2020, the parade also provided audio description via a second audio program channel.

At first, the telecasts were only an hour long. The telecast then expanded to two hours in 1961, reduced to 90 minutes in 1962, reverted to two hours in 1965, and expanded to all three hours of the parade in 1969. The event began to be broadcast in color in 1960. NBC airs the Macy's Thanksgiving Day Parade live in the Eastern Time Zone as well as Puerto Rico and the U.S. Virgin Islands, as the network uses broadcast feeds from that time zone (which due to time differences starts at 10:00 a.m. AST), but tape delays the telecast elsewhere in the continental U.S. and territories from the Central Time Zone westward to allow the program to air in the same 9:00 a.m. to 12:00 p.m. timeslot across its owned-and-operated and affiliated stations (except for Guam, which airs it the day after Thanksgiving at 9:00 a.m. local time, as the territory is located west of the International Date Line and therefore a day ahead from the rest of the United States); since the morning program's expansion to three hours in 2000 (it eventually expanded to four hours in 2007), NBC's Today only airs for two hours on Thanksgiving morning, pre-empting the last two talk-focused hours of the show for the day. NBC began airing a same-day afternoon rebroadcast of the parade in 2009 (replacing the annual broadcast of Miracle on 34th Street, which NBC had lost the broadcast television rights to that year). CBS's unauthorized coverage airs live in most time zones, allowing viewers to see the parade as much as two hours before the official NBC coverage airs in their area; CBS still broadcasts the parade on delay on the West Coast, immediately after the Detroit Lions Thanksgiving game in even-numbered years when CBS carries it, or at 9:00 a.m. local time in odd-numbered years when they carry the Dallas Cowboys Thanksgiving game.

From 1963 to 1972, NBC's coverage was hosted by Lorne Greene (who was then appearing on NBC's Bonanza) and Betty White. David Hartman and Karen Grassle hosted the parade in 1974, With Ed McMahon serving as a man on the street host, He would become a main host in 1977, until 1981. Since 1982, NBC has appointed at least one of the hosts of Today to emcee the television broadcast, starting with Bryant Gumbel, who hosted the parade until 1984. From 1987 to 1997, NBC's coverage was hosted by longtime Today weather anchor Willard Scott. During that period, their co-hosts included Mary Hart, Sandy Duncan, and Today colleagues Deborah Norville and Katie Couric. In recent years, NBC's coverage has been hosted by Today anchors Matt Lauer (from 1998 to 2017), Meredith Vieira (from 2006 to 2010), Ann Curry (2011), Savannah Guthrie (since 2012) and Hoda Kotb (since 2018) as well as Today weather anchor Al Roker who usually joins the producers of the parade or the CEO of Macy's and special guests in the ribbon cutting ceremony. In 2022, Dylan Dreyer filled in for Roker, who was recovering due to health complications involving blood clots, while Kotb hosted the ribbon cutting ceremony segment when the parade reached Herald Square, rather than when it usually takes place in the Upper West Side.

From the early 1970s until 1993, the television broadcast was produced and directed by Dick Schneider; since 1994, it has been executive produced by Brad Lachman (who has otherwise been known for producing reality television series), produced by Bill Bracken and directed by veteran sitcom director Gary Halvorson. Announcements during the telecast were first provided by Bill McCord, then followed in succession by Bill Wendell, Lynda Lopez (the telecast's only female announcer), and longtime Saturday Night Live and NBC staff announcer Don Pardo; from circa 2000 to 2010, announcer duties were helmed by Joel Godard (who also served as the announcer for Late Night with Conan O'Brien for much of that period), and then were assumed by Today announcer Les Marshak with the 2011 telecast. Milton DeLugg served as the telecast's music director until his death in 2015.

CBS's coverage was originally part of the All-American Thanksgiving Day Parade, a broadcast that included footage from multiple parades across North America, including parades at Detroit, Philadelphia and Disneyland (the latter was later replaced by Opryland USA in 1997 and after that Miami Beach), and taped footage of the Toronto Santa Claus Parade (taped usually the second or third weekend of November) and the Aloha Floral Parade in Honolulu (which usually took place in September). Beginning in 2004, however, CBS has focused exclusively on the Macy's parade, but avoids using the Macy's name due to the lack of an official license. To compensate for the fact that the Broadway and music performances can only appear on NBC, CBS adds their own pre-recorded performances (also including Broadway shows, although different from the ones that are part of the official parade and recorded off-site) to fill out the special. With the lack of a live parade for 2020, CBS aired The CBS Thanksgiving Day Celebration—which was hosted by Kevin Frazier and Keltie Knight of Entertainment Tonight, and featured highlights and new performances.

For the 1997 parade, MTV guest reporters, Beavis and Butt-head, with host Kurt Loder, provided their usual style of commentary on aspects of the parade, and of their take on Thanksgiving in general. The special, titled Beavis and Butt-head Do Thanksgiving, included a balloon of Beavis and Butt-head spectating from their couch. The balloon was not participating in the parade, but stationed on top of a building alongside the parade route.

Radio coverage is provided by Audacy's WINS (1010 AM) in New York City. It is one of the few times throughout the year in which that station breaks away from its all-news radio format.

From 2016 to 2019, Verizon produced a 360-degree virtual reality live telecast of the parade, with minimal commentary, made available through YouTube. The 2019 edition, produced in cooperation with NBC, had more extensive production, adding hosts Terry Crews, Lilly Singh and Ross Matthews, also adding "virtual balloons" generated through viewers' votes. Verizon's simulcast of the 2020 event ran in a traditional flat, single-perspective format, and was the very first to be broadcast internationally, not just in the United States, thru Verizon's and Macy's YouTube and Twitter handles. Verizon did not simulcast the 2021 event in either format.

The first ever live international broadcast of the parade occurred in 2020, when Philippine cable television channel TAP TV became the first foreign-based broadcaster to air the parade's live telecast. Before that, the broadcasts were delayed and aired on Black Friday on what is now CNN Philippines until 2013. In addition, delayed broadcasts are aired to United States military installations overseas thru American Forces Network hours following the original U.S. broadcast.

Current hosts
Savannah Guthrie (2012–present)
Hoda Kotb (2018–present)
Al Roker (1995–2021)
Dylan Dreyer (2022)

Past hosts

Parade route
The Parade has always taken place in Manhattan. The parade originally started from 145th Street in Harlem and ended at Macy's flagship in Herald Square (at the intersection of Broadway, Sixth Avenue, and 34th Street), making a  route.

In the 1930s, the balloons were inflated around 110th Street and Amsterdam Avenue, near the Cathedral of St. John the Divine. The parade proceeded south on Amsterdam Avenue to 106th Street and turned east. At Columbus Avenue, the balloons had to be lowered to go under the Ninth Avenue El. Past the El tracks, the parade proceeded east on 106th Street to Central Park West and turned south to terminate at Macy's flagship.

A new route was established for the 2009 parade. From 77th Street and Central Park West, the route went south along Central Park to Columbus Circle, then east along Central Park South. The parade would then make a right turn at 7th Avenue and go south to Times Square. At 42nd Street, the parade turned left and went east, then at 6th Avenue turned right again at Bryant Park. Heading south on 6th Avenue, the parade turned right at 34th Street (at Herald Square) and proceeded west to the terminating point at 7th Avenue where the floats are taken down. The 2009 route change eliminated Broadway completely, where the parade has traveled down for decades. The City of New York said that the new route would provide more space for the parade, and more viewing space for spectators. Another reason for implementing the route change is the city's subsequent transformation of Broadway into a pedestrian-only zone at Times Square.

Another new route was introduced with the 2012 parade. This change is similar to the 2009 route, but eliminated Times Square altogether, instead going east from Columbus Circle along Central Park South, then south on Sixth Avenue to Herald Square.

Balloon teams race through Columbus Circle due to higher winds in this flat area, making it an unsuitable observation location. New York City officials preview the parade route and try to eliminate as many potential obstacles as possible, including rotating overhead traffic signals out of the way. Viewing is restricted from 38th Street through the end of the parade route, as this area is used for the NBC telecast.

Injuries
On November 25, 1993, strong gusts of wind pushed the Sonic the Hedgehog balloon into a lamppost at Columbus Circle. The lamppost damaged the balloon and the top of the post broke off while inside the balloon, dragging it down, injuring a child and an off-duty police officer in the process.

On November 27, 1997, very high winds pushed the Cat in the Hat balloon into a lamppost. The falling debris struck a parade-goer, fracturing her skull and leaving her in a coma for a month. Balloon size regulations were implemented the next year, eliminating larger balloons such as the Cat in the Hat.

On November 24, 2005, the M&M's balloon collided with a streetlight in Times Square; parts of the light fell on two sisters, who suffered minor injuries. As a result, new safety rules were introduced. The M&M's balloon was retired in 2006.

Similar parades
Other American cities also have parades held on Thanksgiving, none of which are run by Macy's. The nation's oldest Thanksgiving parade (the Gimbels parade, which has had many sponsors over the years, and is now known as the 6abc Dunkin' Donuts Thanksgiving Day Parade) was first held in Philadelphia in 1920. Other cities with parades on the holiday include the McDonald's Thanksgiving Parade in Chicago, Illinois and parades in Plymouth, Massachusetts; Seattle, Washington; Houston, Texas; Detroit, Michigan; and Fountain Hills, Arizona. It usually does not duplicate any balloon characters. The Celebrate the Season Parade, held the last Saturday in November in Pittsburgh, was sponsored by Macy's from 2006 to 2013 after Macy's bought the Kaufmann's store chain that had sponsored that parade prior to 2006.

Universal's Holiday Parade Featuring Macy's
Since 2002, Macy's Studios has partnered with the Universal Orlando Resort (owned by NBC parent NBCUniversal) to bring balloons and floats from New York City to the theme park in Florida every holiday season in an event known as the Macy's Holiday Parade. The parade is performed daily and includes the iconic Santa Claus float. Performers from the Orlando area are cast as various clowns, and the park used to invite guests to be "balloon handlers" for the parade. In 2017, the Macy's Holiday Parade was renamed to Universal's Holiday Parade Featuring Macy's. In 2020, as a result of the ongoing COVID-19 pandemic, the parade could not be run. Instead, a walkthrough experience known as Universal's Holiday Experience Featuring Macy's Balloons took place throughout the holiday season, displaying various floats and balloons that would normally be seen in the parade.

In popular culture
 The 1947 film Miracle on 34th Street, begins with the parade, as do most of its remakes. The film portrays the real Santa Claus being hired to work at Macy's after its own Santa impersonator gets drunk during the parade. NBC, in its telecasts, often showed the original 1947 film on Thanksgiving afternoon, following its coverage of the parade and the National Dog Show.
 The 1984 film Broadway Danny Rose features a sequence in which Danny (Woody Allen) and Tina (Mia Farrow) are chased into a warehouse containing Parade materials and helium gas supplies; near the end of the film we see Tina at the Macy's Thanksgiving Parade itself. It is the 1982 Parade, in which we briefly see Sammy Davis, Jr. Milton Berle, who has a small guest role in the film playing himself, was also featured in the Parade, but is not seen in this sequence. 
 In the Seinfeld episode "The Mom and Pop Store", Elaine wins a spot on the parade route for her boss, Mr. Pitt, to hold the Woody Woodpecker balloon.
 The first Thanksgiving-themed episode of Friends centered on the accidental release of the (unused at the time) "Underdog" balloon.
 The parade is featured in the children's book We're Back! A Dinosaur's Story and its animated film adaptation where Rex mistakenly befriends a dinosaur balloon.
 "Macy's Day Parade" is a song by Green Day.
 In 2008, a Coca-Cola CGI ad aired in the United States during Super Bowl XLII. The commercial's plot centered around Underdog and fictional Stewie Griffin balloons chasing a Coke bottle-shaped balloon through New York City. The spot ended with a Charlie Brown balloon holding the Coke balloon. The advertisement won a Silver Lion Award at the annual Lions International Advertising Festival in Cannes, France, that year, and the clip of the commercial with the Griffin balloon was featured in a Macy's commercial in October 2008 (along with clips from Miracle on 34th Street, I Love Lucy, Seinfeld and other media where Macy's was mentioned). The commercial was also referenced in an episode of Family Guy.'' Stewie, one of its main characters, is seen watching the parade only to see the balloon of himself in the parade.
 In the 2016 reboot of Ghostbusters, the Ghostbusters fight a haunted balloon parade including several Macy's balloons from the 1920s, 1930s and 1940s.

See also
 Santa Claus parades
 List of Christmas and holiday season parades

References
Notes

Further reading

External links

 

1924 establishments in New York City
1932 radio programme debuts
1948 American television series debuts
1950s American television series
1960s American television series
1970s American television series
1980s American television series
1990s American television series
2000s American television series
2010s American television series
2020s American television series
American annual television specials
Articles containing video clips
CBS original programming
Festivals established in 1924
Macy's
NBC original programming
November events
Thanksgiving
Parades in the United States
Recurring events established in 1924
Thanksgiving (United States)
Thanksgiving parades